, better known by his stage name , is a Japanese comedian. He has enjoyed success since 2012 with a comedy routine that frequently uses a catch line in which he describes his own antics as "wild".

Early life 
Sugimura was born on 24 August 1973 in Aichi Prefecture, Japan. His parents operated a weaving equipment factory and performed an amateur magician show titled "Magical Takeshi and China Yuriko". He attended the Aichi Prefectural Bisai High School and was a member of the school's baseball club.

Professional career

Early career
Sugiyama commenced his career in entertainment in 1995 after graduating from the Nagoya branch of the  Yoshimoto Kogyo talent school in 1994. He joined the Yoshimoto Creative Agency and was briefly in a manzai duo named "Frankfurt" with a fellow Yoshimoto member. In April 1995, he formed the duo "Reiketsu Sunday" with Noriyuki Sawahara. In 1998, they moved to Tokyo and joined the Asai Kikaku agency. Around the same time they changed the name of their act to "Mekadog" (lit. "Mechanical Dog").

As a solo performer
In January 2008, Sugiyama left Asai Kikaku, and in April, Mekadog disbanded. At this time Sugiyama started performing as a solo act. In April 2011, he joined the Sun Music management agency.

2012 break 
Upon the advice of a fortune teller, Sugiyama adopted the stage name Sugi-chan in November 2011. In March 2012, he was runner-up in the annual "R-1 Grand Prix" for solo comedians, finishing behind Kenji Tada of Cowcow. His "Wild darō?" (lit. "I'm wild, right?") catchphrase brought him national attention and an increase in his workload. In September 2012, he fractured the T-12 vertebra in his spine when diving from a 10 m high platform while filming a variety show for TV Asahi.

In December 2012, his catchphrase "Wild darō?" was chosen as the "New/Vogue Word of the Year" by the U-Can correspondence education group.

Filmography

Television 

 Great Teacher Onizuka (2012 version), Hajime Fukuroda
 Yomedaikō Hajimemashita (2013), opening narration
 Otenki Onēsan (The Weather Girl Knows) (2013), as himself

References

External links 
 
  
 Sun Music profile 
 Asai Kikaku profile 

1973 births
Living people
Japanese comedians
People from Aichi Prefecture